The 2008 season was Liam Sheedy's first season in charge of the Tipperary senior hurling team. He was appointed for a one-year term at a meeting of the county board on 25 September 2007.
Paul Ormond was the team captain for the year but Eoin Kelly was the playing captain when Ormond wasn't named in the team.

On 27 January, Tipperary won the pre-season Waterford Crystal Cup for the second year in a row after a 3–13 to 1–13 defeat of Waterford.
During the National League, Tipperary recorded three wins and two draws to finish second in Division 1B and secure a place in the knock-out stages. Subsequent defeats of Waterford and Kilkenny saw Tipperary qualify for the final in which they defeated Galway by 3–18 to 3–16 to take the title for the 19th time.

In the Munster Championship, Tipperary recorded their first defeat of Cork in Cork since 1923, before winning the Munster title following a 2–21 to 0–19 defeat of Clare in the final.
Tipperary's went on to play Waterford in the All-Ireland semi-final where they lost by two points, it was there only defeat of the year.

Liam Sheedy was reappointment as manager for another term in October 2008.

2008 senior hurling management team

2008 squad
The following players made their competitive senior debut in 2008.

Séamus Callanan against Offaly on 10 February.
Pat Kerwick against Offaly on 10 February.
Paddy Stapleton against Limerick 17 February.

2008 National Hurling League

Division 1B table

Quarter-finals

Semi-finals

Final

2008 Munster Senior Hurling Championship

2008 All-Ireland Senior Hurling Championship

Awards
Brendan Cummins, Conor O'Mahony, and Shane McGrath all won All Star Awards.

References

External links
Tipperary GAA Archives 2008
2008 Teams and Results at Premierview

Tipp
Tipperary county hurling team seasons